Gnilusha is a rural locality (a selo) in Nizhnevedugskoye Rural Settlement, Semiluksky District, Voronezh Oblast, Russia. The population was 444 as of 2010. There are 15 streets.

Geography 
Gnilusha is located 37 km northwest of Semiluki (the district's administrative centre) by road. Izbishche is the nearest rural locality.

References 

Rural localities in Semiluksky District